Carlos Junior Huerto Saavedra (born 26 April 1999) is a Peruvian footballer who plays as a left-back for Peruvian Primera División side Cantolao on loan from Sporting Cristal.

Huerto is also known by his nickname 'Checho'.

Club career

Universidad San Martín
Huerto is a product of Universidad San Martín and made his debut for the club in November 2016. He became a regular starter in the 2018 season with four goals in 30 games. In 2019, Huerto made 25 league appearances.

Sporting Cristal
On 4 January 2020 it was confirmed, that Huerto had joined Sporting Cristal on a deal until the end of 2023. He made his debut for the club on 1 February 2020 against UTC Cajamarca.

To get some more minutes, after playing only 422 minutes in eight games in 2020, Huerto was loaned out back to Universidad San Martín on 9 January 2021 for the entire 2021 season.

On 5 December 2021 it was confirmed, that Huerto would play the 2022 on loan at Sport Boys. However, the spell was cut short and he was instead loaned out to Cantolao in the beginning of July 2022, until the end of the year.

References

External links
 

Living people
1999 births
Association football defenders
Peruvian footballers
Peruvian Primera División players
Club Deportivo Universidad de San Martín de Porres players
Sporting Cristal footballers
Sport Boys footballers
Academia Deportiva Cantolao players